The following is a list of events affecting Canadian television in 1959. Events listed include television show debuts, finales, cancellations, and channel launches.

Notable events
The CBC Television's cross-country television microwave network was extended to Newfoundland and Labrador.

Births

Television shows

Debuts 
Chez Hélène (1959-1973)

Programs on-air this year
Country Canada (1954-2007)
CBC News Magazine (1952-1981) 
The National (1954–present) 
The C.G.E. Show (1952-1959) 
Chez Hélène (1959-1973)
Circle 8 Ranch (1955-1978)
The Friendly Giant (1958-1985) 
Front Page Challenge (1957-1995)
Hockey Night in Canada (1952–present)
Maggie Muggins (1955–1962)
Open House (1952-1962)
Wayne and Shuster Show (1958-1989)

Television stations

Debuts

See also
1959 in Canada 
1959 in television

References